The electoral district of Narre Warren North is an electorate of the Victorian Legislative Assembly and includes the suburbs of Hallam, Narre Warren, Narre Warren North and parts of Berwick, Endeavour Hills and Harkaway.

Narre Warren North was created as a seat with a notional Liberal majority in an electoral redistribution  before the November 2002 state election. In the Labor landslide of that election, new Labor candidate Luke Donnellan overcame the notional majority to defeat Liberal MLC Maree Luckins, who had been attempting to switch to the Legislative Assembly. He was subsequently re-elected in 2006 and 2010, and again in 2014 after the 2013 redistribution slightly increased his majority. In December 2014, Donnellan was appointed Minister for Roads and Road Safety and Minister for Ports in the new Andrews Ministry after Labor's victory at the 2014 election. At the 2022 state election, Labor candidate Belinda Wilson was elected to the seat, following Donnellan's retirement.

Members for Narre Warren North

Election results

References

External links
 Electorate profile: Narre Warren North, Victorian Electoral Commission

2002 establishments in Australia
Electoral districts of Victoria (Australia)
City of Casey
Electoral districts and divisions of Greater Melbourne